Robert Grant Aitken (December 31, 1864 – October 29, 1951) was an American astronomer.

Early life and education 
Robert Grant Aitken was born in Jackson, California, to Scottish immigrant Robert Aitken and Wilhelmina Depinau. Aitken attended Williams College in Massachusetts and graduated with an undergraduate degree in 1887.

Career 
From 1887–1891, he worked as a mathematics instructor at Livermore, California, then received his M.A. from Williams College in 1892. He became a professor of mathematics at the College of the Pacific, another liberal arts school. He was offered an assistant astronomer position at Lick Observatory in California in 1895.

He began a systematically study of double stars, measuring their positions and calculating their orbits around one another. From 1899, in collaboration with W. J. Hussey, he methodically created a very large catalog of such stars. This ongoing work was published in Lick Observatory bulletins. In 1905, Hussey left and Aitken pressed on with the survey alone, and by 1915, he had discovered roughly 3,100 new binary stars, in addition to the 1,300 discovered by Hussey. The results were published in 1932 and entitled New General Catalogue of Double Stars Within 120° of the North Pole, with the orbit information enabling astronomers to calculate stellar mass statistics for a large number of stars. For his work in cataloguing binary stars, he was awarded the prestigious Bruce Medal in 1926.

During his career, Aitken measured positions and computed orbits for comets and natural satellites of planets. In 1908 he joined an eclipse expedition to Flint Island in the central Pacific Ocean. His book Binary Stars was published in 1918, with a second edition published in 1935.

After joining the Astronomical Society of the Pacific in 1894, Aitken was elected to serve as president in 1899 and 1915 of the Astronomical Society of the Pacific. From 1898 to 1942, Aitken was an editor of the Publications of the Astronomical Society of the Pacific. In 1932, he delivered the Darwin Lecture before the Royal Astronomical Society, where he was an associate member. From 1918 to 1928, he was chair of the double star committee for the International Astronomical Union.

Personal life 
Aitken was partly deaf and used a hearing aid. He married Jessie Thomas around 1888; they had three sons and one daughter. Jessie died in 1943. Their son Robert Thomas Aitken was an anthropologist who studied Pacific island cultures. Their grandson, Robert Baker Aitken, was a widely known Zen Buddhist teacher and author. Their granddaughter Marjorie J. Vold was a noted chemist specializing in colloids.

Honors 

Awards
 Lalande Prize of the French Academy (1906, with William Hussey)
 Bruce Medal (1926)
 Gold Medal of the Royal Astronomical Society (1932)
 Rittenhouse Medal (1934)
 Honorary Sc.D. from College of the Pacific, Williams College, University of Arizona, and an honorary LL.D. from the University of California
Named after him
 Minor planet 3070 Aitken
 Lunar crater Aitken, part of the very large South Pole-Aitken basin
Aitken supercomputer at NASA Ames Research Center, Moffett Field, CA

References

External links 

 Bruce Medal page
 Awarding of Bruce Medal
 Awarding of RAS gold medal
 Biographical Memoir (1958) by Van Den Bos at the National academy of Sciences
 Double Star Observer, Cataloguer, Statistician, and Observatory Director
 Additional Photos from the Emilio Segre Visual Archive, American Institute of Physics
 Portrait of Robert G. Aitken from the Lick Observatory Records Digital Archive, UC Santa Cruz Library's Digital Collections
 Digital version of The Binary Stars published by Dover in 1964

Obituaries 
 IrAJ 2 (1952) 27 (one paragraph)
 JO 35 (1952) 25 (in French)
 JRASC 46 (1952) 28
 MNRAS 112 (1952) 271
 PASP 64 (1952) 5

1864 births
1951 deaths
American astronomers
Lick Observatory
Williams College alumni
Recipients of the Bruce Medal
Recipients of the Gold Medal of the Royal Astronomical Society
People from Jackson, California
Members of the United States National Academy of Sciences
Recipients of the Lalande Prize